The Rossa Mediterranea is a breed of domestic goat from the Mediterranean island of Sicily, in southern Italy. It derives from the Damascus goat of Syria and the eastern Mediterranean, and is thus also known as the Derivata di Siria. It is raised mainly in Sicily, but also in Basilicata and Calabria in southern mainland Italy.

The Rossa Mediterranea is one of the forty-three autochthonous Italian goat breeds of limited distribution for which a herdbook is kept by the Associazione Nazionale della Pastorizia, the Italian national association of sheep- and goat-breeders. Total numbers for the breed were recently estimated at about 56,000. At the end of 2013 the registered population was reported as 3385.

Use
The Rossa Mediterranea is a milk breed. Milk production per lactation for pluriparous nannies is approximately 570 kg, and may reach 750 kg. The milk has an average of 4.11% fat and 3.53% protein, and is used predominantly for cheese-making.

References

Goat breeds
Dairy goat breeds
Goat breeds originating in Italy